Beck's Triad may refer to:

Beck's triad (cardiology)
Beck's cognitive triad